The 1994 AT&T Challenge was an ATP men's tennis  tournament held in Atlanta, Georgia, United States that was part of the World Series of the 1994 ATP Tour. It was the tenth edition of the tournament and was held from April 25 through May 2, 1994. First-seeded Michael Chang won the singles title.

Finals

Singles

 Michael Chang defeated  Todd Martin, 6–7(4–7), 7–6(7–4), 6–0
 It was Chang's 4th singles title of the year and 17th of his career.

Doubles

 Jared Palmer /  Richey Reneberg defeated  Francisco Montana /  Jim Pugh 4–6, 7–6, 6–4

References

External links
 ITF tournament edition details

ATandT Challenge
Verizon Tennis Challenge
ATandT Challenge